Rook is a trick-taking game, usually played with a specialized deck of cards. Sometimes referred to as Christian cards or missionary cards, Rook playing cards were introduced by Parker Brothers in 1906 to provide an alternative to standard playing cards for those in the Puritan tradition, and those in Mennonite culture who considered the face cards in a regular deck inappropriate because of their association with gambling and cartomancy.

Rook playing cards 

George S. Parker and his wife Grace sought to create a deck of cards that could be marketed to people with religious objections to the standard deck.
To accomplish this, George and Grace recast the standard deck of playing cards. They replaced the Ace with a "1" and the jack, queen, and king with "11", "12", and "13" cards, and added a "14" card as well. The hearts, spades, clubs, and diamonds were replaced with "suits" of colors: red, yellow, green, and black. With this new fifty-six-card deck, whist and most other common card games could be faithfully played.
Grace chose the name "Rook", and with the addition of a "Rook" card (serving as the Joker) the 57-card deck took its final shape.

Official rules 

The official rules for Tournament Rook (also known as Kentucky Discard) are as follows.

Four players are organized into two teams of two players each, sitting opposite each other. Players must keep their hands secret from all other players, including their teammates. The object of the game is to be the first team to reach 300 points by capturing cards with a point value in tricks. If both teams have over 300 points at the end of a round, the team with the higher point total wins.

Only certain cards have a point value. These are known as counters. Each 5 is worth 5 points, each 10 and 14 is worth 10 points, and the Rook Bird card is worth 20 points.

The deal 
The 1s, 2s, 3s, and 4s are removed from the deck, and the Rook Bird card is added, for a total of 41 cards. The dealer shuffles and cuts the deck, then deals all of the cards, one at a time. After every player has received his or her first card, the dealer places one card face-down in the center of the table. This is repeated until there are five cards (the nest) in the middle of the table. The remaining cards are dealt normally.

Bidding 
After the deal, players bid in increments of 5 points for the privilege of naming the trump suit. Bidding starts with the player to the left of the dealer and passes clockwise. The minimum bid is 70 points, and the maximum is 120 points (the number of points a team would make if they captured all the counters in the game). Players choosing not to increase the bid may pass to the next player. A player that has passed may not make another bid for the round. The high bidder adds the five cards of the nest to his or her hand, then lays any five cards to the side. The high bidder then names the trump suit. At any time during the bidding process, a player can call a redeal if they have no points in their hand.

Play 
After the trump suit has been named, the player to the left of the dealer places any card of any suit face-up on the center of the table. Play proceeds clockwise, with each player playing one card face-up in turn. After each player has played, the player that played the highest card of the suit of the leading card takes all of the cards played, or "takes the trick".

A player must either follow suit (play a card of the leading suit) or play the Rook Bird card. Players with no cards of the leading suit may play any other card, including the Rook Bird card or a card of the trump suit. The highest card of the leading suit takes the trick, unless a trump card is played, in which case the highest trump card takes the trick.

The error of a player reneging, or failing to follow suit, may be corrected before the next trick is taken. If it is not discovered until later, the round ends, and the team that made the error loses a number of points equal to the bid, regardless of which team made the bid. The opponents score all the counters they captured before the error was discovered.

The person who takes the trick leads in the next trick. When a trick is taken, it is placed face-down in front of the player who took it. Tricks taken may not be reviewed by any player until the end of the round. The player that takes the last trick in a round captures the nest and scores any counters in it.

The Rook Bird card 
The Rook Bird card may be played at any time, even if the player who holds it is able to follow suit, and is the only card that may be played this way.

If the Rook Bird card is led, all other players must play a trump card, if they have one. The Rook Bird must be played when the trump suit is led and the player holding the Rook Bird card cannot follow suit.

Scoring 
When all possible tricks have been taken, each team adds the counters they captured. If the bidding team failed to make the number of points bid, the team loses a number of points equal to the amount of the bid, and does not make any points for counters captured in the round. The opposing team receives points for any counters they captured.

Variants

Standard playing cards 

Kentucky Discard Rook may be played with standard playing cards by removing the 2s, 3s, and 4s from the deck, playing Aces high, and adding one joker to be used as the Rook Bird card. When playing with such a deck scoring changes as follows: each 5 is worth 5 points, each ace and 10 is worth 10 points, and the joker is worth 20 points.

A common alternate form of the game (as described in Hoyle's Rules of Games) uses a complete deck of standard playing cards but assigns the point cards differently (aces = 15, kings = 10, tens = 10, fives = 5), and is essentially similar to the 1-High Partnership described below.

Four-player partnership 

Since the game of Rook has been played for over a century, many local variants are in existence for the four-player partnership form of the game. Perhaps foremost is that the game can be played exactly according to the above Kentucky Discard Tournament rules, except using the entire deck, giving all players 13 cards with a 5-card nest. Other variants, including the original form of Kentucky Discard, do not include the Rook Bird, while still others make the Rook Bird the lowest trump or change its relative value, are played without a nest, add the 1 as a 15-point counter that is the highest card in each suit, or give a 20-point bonus for winning the majority of tricks or the last trick. Most of these variants are described in a book titled Rook in a Book published by Winning Moves, and in the official rules that come with Parker Bros editions of Rook.

The two official variants of four-player partnership Rook described by the game publishers are Kentucky Discard Rook (Tournament Rules), and Regular Partnership Rook:
 Kentucky Discard Rook (Tournament Rules) is the most popular form of the game, and the rules have been described above. Officially recognized variants of Kentucky Discard Rook (Tournament Rules) include Kentucky Discard Original Rules (eliminates the Rook Bird card), The Red 1 (adds the red 1 card as a higher 30 point trump), and Buckeye (adds 1s as 15 point counters that are the highest cards in each suit).
 Regular Partnership Rook is played with all cards 1-14, but without the Rook Bird or a nest, and 20 points is given to the partnership that wins the majority of tricks. Officially recognized variants of Regular Partnership Rook include Dixie (which uses a nest and uses the 13 as a 10-point counter instead of the 14), Display, and Boston (both of which involve the declarer playing the partner's hand as a dummy, similar to Bridge).

Rook in a Book describes other common variants, including 1-High Partnership. This game is very similar to the version of the game for regular playing cards as it appears in Hoyle's Rules of Games and many internet sources. It is played with all cards 1-14, adding the 1s as 15 point counters that are the highest cards in each suit. The Rook Bird functions as the lowest trump and is worth 20 points, and an additional 20 points is given to the partnership that wins the majority of tricks.

Trump calling variants 

Low Card Low card can be called when the bid is taken, in this scenario the Rook Bird becomes the 10.5 of trump, fives are the best, and ones are the worst with quality of card descending as the number gets higher. It can be called low card with any color being trump.
No Trump No trump hands can be called, when this is done, the Rook Bird becomes the 10.5 of Red, and there is no trump, all cards play as if they were off suit. This can be called in conjuncture with high card or low card.
Circus Rook Circus Rook is a variant where when the winning bid is earned, the player who takes the kitty calls "Circus Rook". After this is called, the person to the immediate left would call trump, and give their best card to the player to their left (for instance, if high card green is called, and the rook Bird was in an opponents hand, they would pass it to their left) the player who called circus rook and his partner would then pass their worst card to their left (most likely a low off suit card). The game play then continues with the team who called trump leading.
Black 2 Trump The black 2 is known as the "little rook" and is the second highest trump card in the game.

Other 
Many other forms of the game can be played with 2 to 8 players, both with and without partnerships.

A version for an odd number of players is known as "call-your-partner Rook." Typically played with 5 players, the player who wins the bid immediately "calls" one card to add to his team. The player holding the named card called secretly partners with the bid-winner until play reveals the card and partner's location. Points in a hand are divided between the two teams that formed during play, but scores are recorded individually over a series of hands, as partnerships change from hand to hand. After winning a bid, a player is often faced with the choice of calling a high trump card, or a high card of another suit to be his or her partner. The three defenders meanwhile are often forced to choose whether to add points to a hand when the identity of the partner remains unknown.

Another version which is very popular and similar to the above variant, "call-your-partner Rook", can be played with 4, 5, or 6 players. There are 180 total points for every hand, 1s = 15, 14s = 10, 10s = 10, 5s = 5, and the Rook Bird card = 20. The team who takes the last hand also gets 20 points and the kitty or nest, and whatever points are there. Rook can be called high or low by the bid winner as well as which card of which suit that person wants as their partner. The Rook Bird card is always trump and must be played likewise. When called low, it is the lowest possible trump(below the 2 card); when called high, it is the highest possible trump. The 1 card is the highest card of each suit, unless the Rook Bird card is called high. Players must follow suit when discarding, the player with the Rook Bird card may not play it anytime (unlike other versions). When playing with 6 players, the bid winner is allowed to call 2 cards as partners. After the bid winner exchanges cards with the kitty, they then must declare if there are points in the kitty. Next they state which card or cards will be their partner, whether Rook is high or low and which color is trump. In 4 player Rook there are 5 cards in the kitty, 5 player has 7 cards in the kitty(since the bid winner and their partner will be against 3 opponents), and 6 player has 3 cards in the kitty. If the 2s, 3s and 4s are removed the number of cards in the kitty remains the same except for 5 player Rook, which will then have 5 cards in the kitty.

Another four-player version which uses all the same cards as the version of "call-your-partner Rook" which would include using the all four 1s and also using all suits of 5s through 14s. The total point count is at 180 points. The point system uses the 1s = 15, 14s = 10, 10s = 10, 5s = 5, and the Rook Bird still valued at 20. The game still follows the standard still of play only difference is that the 1s are included and they replace the 14s as the highest of their suit.

References 

Orbanes, Philip E. (1999). Rook in a Book. Winning Moves, Inc. .

External links 
 PDF Rules Tournament rules for Kentucky Discard from Hasbro
 Coit Morrison's ROOK Card Collection A collection of old and new ROOK Card sets and related items.
 BGG Rook page boardgamegeek.com's information page with pictures and discussion about Rook
 ROOK Card Collectors Association Organization with the goal of educating and networking ROOK card collectors.

Trick-taking card games
Card games introduced in 1906
Dedicated deck card games
Parker Brothers games
Winning Moves games